Aphrophora is a genus of spittlebugs in the family Aphrophoridae. There are at least 80 described species in Aphrophora.

Species 
Species within this genus include:

 Aphrophora alni  (European alder spittlebug)
 Aphrophora ambigua 
 Aphrophora ampliata 
 Aphrophora angulata 
 †Aphrophora angusta  (Ypresian, Allenby Formation)
 Aphrophora annulata 
 Aphrophora aurata 
 Aphrophora bimaculata 
 Aphrophora binomoriensis 
 Aphrophora bipartita 
 Aphrophora bipunctata 
 Aphrophora bisignata 
 Aphrophora brachycephala 
 Aphrophora canadensis 
 Aphrophora chilensis 
 Aphrophora consobrina 
 Aphrophora consocia 
 Aphrophora corticea 
 Aphrophora cribrata  (pine spittlebug)
 Aphrophora detrita 
 Aphrophora detritus 
 Aphrophora eruginosa 
 Aphrophora exoleta 
 Aphrophora exoleta 
 Aphrophora flavicosta 
 Aphrophora forneri 
 Aphrophora fulva 
 Aphrophora gelida  (boreal spittlebug)
 Aphrophora grisea 
 Aphrophora harimaensis 
 Aphrophora harmandi 
 Aphrophora horishana 
 Aphrophora horizontalis 
 Aphrophora impressa 
 Aphrophora inflexa 
 Aphrophora irrorata 
 Aphrophora jacobii 
 Aphrophora jalapae 
 Aphrophora karenkoensis 
 Aphrophora koshireana 
 Aphrophora laevior 
 Aphrophora maculata 
 Aphrophora maculosa 
 Aphrophora major 
 Aphrophora mandschurica 
 Aphrophora matsumurai 
 Aphrophora memorabilis 
 Aphrophora meridionalis 
 Aphrophora moorei 
 Aphrophora murina 
 Aphrophora naevia 
 Aphrophora nagasawae 
 Aphrophora nancyae 
 Aphrophora nigronervosa 
 Aphrophora nuwarana 
 Aphrophora okinawana 
 Aphrophora ovalis 
 Aphrophora parallella  (spruce spittlebug)
 Aphrophora peanensis 
 Aphrophora perdubia 
 Aphrophora permutata  (douglas-fir spittlebug)
 Aphrophora phlava 
 Aphrophora phuliginosa 
 Aphrophora policlora 
 Aphrophora princeps  (cone spittlebug)
 Aphrophora punctifrons 
 Aphrophora punctipes 
 Aphrophora quadriguttata 
 Aphrophora quadrinotata  (four-spotted spittlebug)
 Aphrophora regina 
 Aphrophora rubiginosa 
 Aphrophora rubra 
 Aphrophora rufiventris 
 Aphrophora rugosipennis 
 Aphrophora sachalinensis 
 Aphrophora salicina  (willow spittlebug)
 Aphrophora salicis 
 Aphrophora saratogensis  (Saratoga spittlebug)
 Aphrophora signoretii 
 Aphrophora similis 
 Aphrophora straminea 
 Aphrophora tahagii 
 Aphrophora takaii 
 Aphrophora tomom 
 Aphrophora vittata 
 Aphrophora yohenai

References

Aphrophoridae
Auchenorrhyncha genera